Conus milneedwardsi, known to collectors as the "Glory of India", is a species of sea snail, a marine gastropod mollusk in the family Conidae, the cone snails and their allies.

Like all species within the genus Conus, these snails are predatory and venomous. They are capable of "stinging" humans, therefore live ones should be handled carefully or not at all.

Subspecies
 Conus milneedwardsi clytospira Melvill & Standen, 1899
 Conus milneedwardsi eduardi Delsaerdt, 1997
 Conus milneedwardsi lemuriensis Wils & Delsaerdt, 1989
 Conus milneedwardsi milneedwardsi Jousseaume, 1894: common name: the Glory of India cone

Description
The size of an adult shell varies between 46 mm and 185 mm. This species has a rather thin and slender shell with a smooth surface, an acuminate Spire and an angulate shoulder. The color of the shell is white with two chocolate spiral bands on the body whorl. This body whorl shows a pattern of axial reddish brown reticulated lines forming white triangles or quadrangular markings.

Distribution
This marine species occurs off Madagascar and off the African coast from KwaZulu-Natal, South Africa, to the Red Sea; in the China Sea; in the Indian Ocean off Bombay.

The subspecies C. m. clytospira Melvill & Standen, 1899 occurs from Pakistan to India and Sri Lanka, C. m. lemuriensis Wils & Delsaerdt, 1989 in the Indian Ocean along Réunion and Mauritius.

References

 Jousseaume, F., 1894. Diagnose des coquilles de nouveaux mollusques. Bulletin de la Société Philomathique de Paris 6: 98–105, sér. 8 série
 Schmidt, W. & O. Bellec (1994). Findings of some uncommon sea-shells off Madagascar. African Journal of Tropical Hydrobiology and Fisheries 5(1): 63 – 66.
 Filmer R.M. (2001). A Catalogue of Nomenclature and Taxonomy in the Living Conidae 1758 – 1998. Backhuys Publishers, Leiden. 388pp
 Tucker J.K. (2009). Recent cone species database. September 4, 2009 Edition
 Tucker J.K. & Tenorio M.J. (2009) Systematic classification of Recent and fossil conoidean gastropods. Hackenheim: Conchbooks. 296 pp.
 Puillandre N., Duda T.F., Meyer C., Olivera B.M. & Bouchet P. (2015). One, four or 100 genera? A new classification of the cone snails. Journal of Molluscan Studies. 81: 1–23

External links

 The Conus Biodiversity website
 
Cone Shells – Knights of the Sea
 Syntype in MNHN, Paris

milneedwardsi
Gastropods described in 1894